Arturo Carmona (28 September 1909 – 4 December 1966) was a Chilean footballer. He played in eight matches for the Chile national football team from 1935 to 1937. He was also part of Chile's squad for the 1935 South American Championship.

References

External links
 

1909 births
1966 deaths
Chilean footballers
Chile international footballers
Place of birth missing
Association football forwards
Magallanes footballers